This is a list of player transfers involving RFU Championship teams before or during the 2015–16 season. The list is of deals that are confirmed and are either from or to a rugby union team in the Championship during the 2014–15 season. It is not unknown for confirmed deals to be cancelled at a later date.

Bedford Blues

Players In
 Steffan Jones from  Newport Gwent Dragons
 Sam Blanchet from  England Sevens
 Myles Dorrian from  London Irish
 Jack Culverhouse from  Hertford RFC
 Mark Flanagan from  Mont-de-Marsan
 Sam James from  Wasps
 Jordan Burns from  Harlequins

Players Out
 Darryl Veenendaal to  Nottingham
 Antonio Harris to  Nottingham
 Viliami Hakalo to  Nottingham
 Jim Wigglesworth to  Doncaster Knights

Bristol

Players In
 Tom Varndell from  Wasps
 Marc Jones from  Sale Sharks
 Gavin Henson from  Bath Rugby
 Jamal Ford-Robinson from  Cornish Pirates
 Will Cliff from  Sale Sharks
 James Phillips from  London Scottish
 Rayn Smid from  Western Province

Players Out
 Ross Rennie retired
 Andy Short to  Worcester Warriors
 Nicky Robinson to  Oyonnax
 Luke Baldwin to  Worcester Warriors
 Mark Cooke to  Jersey
 Rhys Lawrence to  Ealing Trailfinders
 Ben Skirving retired
 Ryan Jones retired
 Marco Mama to  Worcester Warriors (season-loan)

Cornish Pirates

Players In
 Alex Day from  Northampton Saints
 Brett Beukeboom from  Plymouth Albion
 Toby May from  Westcombe Park
 Will Cargill from  Yorkshire Carnegie

Players Out
 Tom Kessell to  Northampton Saints
 Jamal Ford-Robinson to  Bristol Rugby
 Darren Barry to  Worcester Warriors

Doncaster Knights

Players In
 Ollie Stedman from  London Welsh
 Will Hurrell from  Coventry RFC
 Simon Humberstone from  Cardiff Blues
 Jake Armstrong from  Wharfedale
 Michael Heaney from  Ulster
 Declan Cusack from  Plymouth Albion
 Sam Edgerley from  England Sevens
 Joe Sproston from  Ampthill
 Jim Wigglesworth from  Bedford Blues
 Ted Stagg from  Plymouth Albion

Players Out
 Tom Davies retired
 Jamie Lennard retired
 Bruno Bravo to  Darlington Mowden Park
 Phil Eggleshaw to  Hull Ionians
 Paul Roberts to  Esher RFC
 Colin Phillips to  Stewart's Melville RFC
 Will Foden to  Hull Ionians
 Tomasi Palu to  Wellington Lions
 Ross Davies released
 Latiume Fosita released

Ealing Trailfinders

Players In
 Tom Bliss from  Wasps (season-loan)
 Nathan Hannay from  Yorkshire Carnegie
 Iain Grieve from  Plymouth Albion
 Joe Munro from  Nottingham
 Michael Holford from  Nottingham
 George Porter from  Worcester Warriors
 Toby Howley-Berridge from  Plymouth Albion
 Rhys Lawrence from  Bristol Rugby
 Sam Rodman unattached
 Tristan Roberts from  London Welsh
 Alex Davies from  London Welsh
 Rhys Crane from  London Welsh
 Chris York from  Newcastle Falcons
 Danny Barnes from  Newcastle Falcons
 Harrison Orr from  West Harbour
 Callum Wilson from  England Sevens
 Adam Precanin from  London Scottish
 Sam Stanley from  England Sevens
 James Stephenson from  Worcester Warriors

Players Out
 Andrei Radoi to  Timișoara Saracens
 Anders Nilsson to  Blackheath
 Michael Walker-Fitton to  CR El Salvador
 Steve Pape retired
 Tom Parker to  East Grinstead RFC
 James Copsey to  East Grinstead RFC
 Matt Jarvis to  Merthyr RFC
 Ignas Darkintis to  Darlington Mowden Park
 Kevin Davis to  Esher RFC
 Gary Johnson released
 Tom Brown released
 Ronnie McLean released

Jersey

Players In
 Jack Moates from  Wasps
 Oli Evans from  Wasps
 Charlie Butterworth from  Ulster
 Ross Adair from  Ulster
 Ben Featherstone from  Esher
 James Freeman from  Loughborough Students RUFC
 Brendon Cope from  Durban Collegians
 Mark Cooke from  Bristol Rugby
 Seán McCarthy from  Leinster
 Richard Lane from  Bath Rugby
 Cosma Garfagnoli from  Rovigo
 Tommy Spinks from  Glasgow Warriors
 Russell Anderson from  Darlington Mowden Park
 Rhys Owens from  Loughborough Students RUFC

Players Out
 Drew Locke to  London Scottish
 Harry Williams to  Exeter Chiefs
 Ryan Hodson to  London Welsh
 Ryan Glynn to  London Welsh
 Jonny Bentley to  Wellington Lions
 David Bishop to  Merthyr RFC
 Paula Kaho to  Merthyr RFC
 Ben Maidment released
 Gareth Harris released
 Grant Pointer released
 Mark Foster released
 Michael Noone released
 Myles Landwick released
 Tobias Hoskins released

London Scottish

Players In
 Drew Locke from  Jersey
 Neale Patrick from  Plymouth Albion
 Russell Weir from  Scotland Sevens
 Dave Young from  Newport Gwent Dragons
 Jason Harries from  Wales Sevens
 Rory Bartle from  Gloucester Rugby
 Jimmy Litchfield from  London Welsh
 Will Carrick-Smith from  Exeter Chiefs
 Tyrone Moran from  Munster
 Kurt Schonert from  Durban Collegians

Players Out
 Jim Thompson retired
 Errie Claassens retired
 Jamie Stevenson to  Wasps
 Adam Precanin to  Ealing Trailfinders
 James Phillips to  Bristol Rugby
 Ben Prescott retired

London Welsh

Players In
 Guy Armitage from  London Irish
 Josh Drauniniu from  Worcester Warriors
 Martyn Thomas from  Wasps
 Kieran Murphy from  CA Brive
 Ryan Hodson from  Jersey
 Gus Jones from  Wasps
 Will Skuse from  Bath Rugby
 Joe Carlisle from  Benetton Treviso
 Josh Davies from  Plymouth Albion
 Darryl Marfo from  Harlequins
 Harry Allen from  London Irish
 Ryan Glynn from  Jersey
 Daniel Leo from  London Irish
 Brendon Snyman from  US Montauban
 Thretton Palamo from  Saracens (season-loan)

Players Out
 Tom May retired
 Opeti Fonua to  Leicester Tigers
 Carl Kirwan to  Worcester Warriors
 Piri Weepu to  Oyonnax
 Taione Vea to  Newcastle Falcons
 Paul Rowley to  Ulster
 Peter Browne to  Ulster
 Dean Schofield to  Yorkshire Carnegie
 Seb Stegmann to  Yorkshire Carnegie
 Elliot Kear to  London Broncos
 Gordon Ross retired
 Ollie Stedman to  Doncaster Knights
 Lachlan McCaffrey to  Leicester Tigers
 Tristan Roberts to  Ealing Trailfinders
 Alex Davies to  Ealing Trailfinders
 Rhys Crane to  Ealing Trailfinders
 Ed Hoadley to  Dunedin RFC
 James Tincknell to  Coventry RFC
 Tim Molenaar to  Moseley
 Jimmy Litchfield to  London Scottish
 Chris Hala'ufia to  RC Narbonne
 Daniel Browne to  Rosslyn Park
 Nathan Taylor to  Burton RFC
 James Down to  Cardiff Blues

Moseley

Players In
 Glyn Hughes from  Wasps
 Buster Lawrence from  Wasps
 Joe Bercis from  Ampthill
 Tom Fidler from  Plymouth Albion
 Aaron Pinches from  Bedwas RFC
 Kyle Evans from  Scarlets
 Aaron Flagg from  Abbotsford
 Harry Casson from  Yorkshire Carnegie
 Tim Molenaar from  London Welsh
 Rhys Williams from  Leicester Tigers
 Charlie Foley from  Plymouth Albion

Players Out
 Will Owen to  Rotherham Titans
 Ollie Thomas retired
 Neil Mason retired
 Joe Carpenter to  Coventry RFC
 Nile Dacres to  Plymouth Albion
 Anthony Carter retired

Nottingham

Players In
 Kieran Davies from  Exeter Chiefs
 Ben Morris from  Newcastle Falcons
 Rob Langley from  Plymouth Albion
 Ben Woods from  Plymouth Albion
 Lawrence Rayner from  Plymouth Albion
 Tom Heard from  Plymouth Albion
 Darryl Veenendaal from  Bedford Blues
 Antonio Harris from  Bedford Blues
 Viliami Hakalo from  Bedford Blues
 Josh Skelcey from  Northampton Saints
 Sam Coghlan Murray from  Leinster
 Murray McConnell from  Glasgow Warriors
 Ricky Andrew from  Ulster

Players Out
 Finlay Barnham retired
 Campese Ma'afu to  Provence
 Shaun Malton to  Exeter Chiefs
 Liam O'Neill to  Henley Hawks
 Sean Romans retired
 Brent Wilson retired
 Joe Munro to  Ealing Trailfinders
 Michael Holford to  Ealing Trailfinders
 Tom Calladine to  Rotherham Titans
 Ryan Hough to  Coventry RFC
 Kiefer Laxton to  Ampthill
 Will Maisey to  Ampthill
 Cameron Lee-Everton released
 Rory Lynn released
 Edward Styles released
 Corey Venus released

Rotherham Titans

Players In
 Will Owen from  Moseley
 Luke Carter from  Rosslyn Park
 Jack Hayes from  Chinnor
 Josh Redfern from  Sheffield Tigers
 Darran Harris from  Scarlets
 James Elliott from  Old Centralians
 Will Goodwin from  Chester
 Charlie Maddison from  Darlington Mowden Park
 Michael Cromie from  Stade Rodez
 Toby Salmon from  Chinnor
 Tom Calladine from  Nottingham
 George Oram from  Blackheath
 Andy Davies from  Newcastle Falcons
 Joe Barker from  Hull Ionians
 Tim Cree from  Canberra Vikings
 Kyle Gilmour from  Prairie Wolf Pack
 Ross Jones from  Ospreys

Players Out
 Tom Cruse to  London Irish
 Alex Rieder to  Wasps
 Ben Thomas to  Coventry RFC

Yorkshire Carnegie

Players In
 Kevin Sinfield from  Leeds Rhinos
 Dean Schofield from  London Welsh
 Seb Stegmann from  London Welsh
 Andy Saull from  Newcastle Falcons
 Joel Hodgson from  Northampton Saints
 Tom Ryder from  Northampton Saints
 Tom Casson from  Harlequins
 Andy Forsyth from  Sale Sharks
 Rob O'Donnell from  Worcester Warriors

Players Out
 Ben Harris to  Newcastle Falcons
 Paul Hill to  Northampton Saints
 Rob Vickerman retired
 Nathan Hannay to  Ealing Trailfinders
 Will Cargill to  Cornish Pirates
 Harry Casson to  Moseley
 Sam Egerton to  England Sevens
 Ollie Hayes retired

See also
List of 2015–16 Premiership Rugby transfers
List of 2015–16 Pro12 transfers
List of 2015–16 Top 14 transfers
List of 2015–16 Super Rugby transfers
List of 2015 SuperLiga transfers

References

2015-16
2015–16 RFU Championship